Rueda is a Spanish surname. Notable people with the surname include:

Aitor Monroy Rueda (born 1987), Spanish footballer
Alfonso Rueda (born 1968), Spanish politician
Antonio Vasconcelos Rueda (born 1970), Mexican politician
Armando Rueda (born 1929), Mexican weightlifter
Arnoldo Rueda Medina (born 1969), former Mexican drug lord
Belén Rueda (born 1965), Spanish actress
Carla Rueda (born 1990), Peruvian volleyball player
Claudia Rueda, Colombian picture book author and illustrator
David Rueda, Ecuadorian professor of comparative politics 
Diego Rueda Rico (1575–1639), Roman Catholic prelate
Eduardo Rueda (born 1972), Mexican diver
Esteban Rueda (born 1996), Argentine footballer
Eva Rueda (born 1971), Spanish artistic gymnast
Fabiola Rueda (born 1963), Colombian mountain runner
Francisco Rueda (diver) (born 1958), Mexican diver
Francisco Rueda (footballer) (born 1983), Mexican footballer
Héctor Rueda Hernández (1920–2011), Colombian Roman Catholic prelate
Iñaki Rueda, Spanish Formula One engineer
Javier Ruiz Rueda (1909–1993), Mexican composer and writer
Jesús Rueda (composer) (born 1961), Spanish composer
Jesús Rueda (footballer) (born 1987), Spanish footballer
José Rueda (1900-????), Brazilian footballer
José Antonio Rueda (born 2005), Spanish motorcycle racer
José Manuel Rueda (born 1988), Spanish footballer
Julio Jiménez Rueda (1896–1960), Mexican lawyer, writer, playwright and diplomat
Kevin Rueda (born 1969), American soccer player 
Lizeth Rueda (born 1994), Mexican distance swimmer
Lope de Rueda (c.1510–1565), Spanish dramatist and author
Luis Rueda (born 1972), Argentine footballer and coach
Luis Enrique Rueda Otero (1910–1974), Colombian pioneering dentist
Luis José Rueda Aparicio (born 1962), Colombian Roman Catholic prelate
Manuel Rueda (born 1980), Spanish  footballer
Marta Ruedas, United Nations civil servant 
Matías Rueda (born 1988), Argentine boxer 
Martin Rueda, Swiss footballer
Mikel Rueda (born 1980), Spanish film director and screenwriter
Mónica Rueda (born 1976), Spanish field hockey player
Paula Andrea Rodriguez Rueda (born 1996), Colombian chess player
Ramsés Rueda Rueda, Colombian air force general
Rafael Pardo Rueda (born 1953), Colombian politician
Reinaldo Rueda (born 1957), Colombian football manager
Reyna Rueda (born 1969/1970), Nicaraguan politician
Toni Casals Rueda (born 1980), Andorran ski mountaineer

Spanish-language surnames